The third Women's U.S. Cup tournament held in 1997, were joined by four teams: Australia, Canada, Italy and USA.

Matches

Final placing

References

1998
1997 in women's association football
1997 in American women's soccer
1996–97 in Italian women's football
1996–97 in Australian women's soccer
1997 in Canadian soccer
May 1997 sports events in the United States
June 1997 sports events in the United States